The Camp Clipper and Camp Essex were sub camps of the US Army Desert Training Center in Riverside County, California. The main headquarters for the Desert Training Center was Camp Young. This is where General Patton's 3rd Armored Division was stationed. Camp Clipper was designated a California Historic Landmark (No.985.5). Currently at the south end of the Mojave National Preserve. Camp Clipper was just to the east of Camp Essex. Clipper was a temporary camp for incoming and out going troops. Camp Essex was named after a small town near the camp, Essex, San Bernardino County, California. Near Camp Clipper was the 4,500 foot Camp Essex Army Airfield.

Built in 1942, Camp Essex and Camp Clipper were built to prepare troops to do battle in North Africa to fight the Nazis during World War II.  At Camp Clipper were trained the 93rd Infantry Division. The trained troops went on to fight in the North African campaign. There was a temporary camp built for the training of the 33rd Infantry Division. When completed the camp had 36 shower buildings, outdoor theater, 191 latrines, 149 wooden tent frames, and a 50,000-gallon water tank.  Also built was a 500,000 gallon concrete reservoir and two 740-foot-deep wells. Camp had 14 training ranges. The camp was used shortly in 1944 for Italian prisoners of war. The camp closed on 16 March 1944 and is now overseen by the Bureau of Land Management. The army used live-fire exercises and warning signs are still on the site.

Operating Camp Essex:
 356th Engineer General Service Regiment (AGF)
 Company A
 Company E
 Trained at the camp:  93rd Infantry Division from July of 193 to October 1943

Operating Camp Clipper:
 16th Special Service Company (AGF)
 2nd Service Platoon
 605th Engineer Camouflage Battalion (AGF)
 Company C
 Trained at the camp: 33rd infantry Division from April 1943 to July 1943

Camp Essex Army Airfield
There was an air strip near Camp Clipper to support training activities. The runway was two 4,500 feet long runs made of steel landing mats with 6 parking pads at each end of the runway. The runway ran north-south, parallel to the old U.S. Route 66 and Camp Clipper. The runway was for the use of small planes, like the L-4 Piper Aircraft so the vast training grounds could be watched from the air. The runway was long enough for large planes to use in training exercises: Douglas C-50 cargo plane, Douglas A-20 Havoc, Curtiss P-40 Warhawk, Lockheed P-38 Lightning and Consolidated B-24 Liberator. In early 1950 the airfield was used as a private airfield, being not maintained it was abandoned in the late 1950s.

Marker
Marker at the Eastbound Rest Stop in California reads:
NO. 985 DESERT TRAINING CENTER, CALIFORNIA-ARIZONA MANEUVER AREA (ESTABLISHED BY MAJOR GENERAL GEORGE S. PATTON, JR.) - CAMP CLIPPER - Camp Clipper was established at a site that reached from Essex Road to this location in the Spring of 1942. It was one of twelve such camps built in the southwestern deserts to harden and train United States troops for service on the battlefields of World War II. The Desert Training Center was a simulated theater of operations that included portions of California, Arizona, and Nevada. The other camps were Young, Coxcomb, Iron Mountain, Ibis, Granite, Pilot Knob, Laguna, Horn, Ryder, Bouse and Rice. A total of 13 infantry divisions and 7 armored divisions plus numerous smaller units were trained in this harsh environment. The Training Center was in operation for almost two years and was closed early in 1944 when the last units were shipped overseas. During the brief period of operation over one million American soldiers were trained for combat. The 33rd and 93rd Infantry Divisions were trained here.

See also
California Historical Landmarks in San Bernardino County, California
California Historical Landmarks in Riverside County, California
Camp Coxcomb 
Camp Granite 
Camp Iron Mountain
Camp Ibis
California during World War II

External links
Training Center Boogie - Sony by John Malcolm Penn, song about : Desert training camps

References

Military in San Bernardino County, California
Military installations in California
Closed training facilities of the United States Army
History of San Bernardino, California
United States in World War II
1942 establishments in California